Arsenite minerals are very rare oxygen-bearing arsenic minerals. Classical world localities where such minerals occur include the complex skarn manganese deposit at Långban (Sweden) and the polymetallic Tsumeb deposit (Namibia). The most often reported arsenite anion in minerals is the AsO33− anion, present for example in reinerite Zn3(AsO3)2. Unique diarsenite anions occur i. e. in leiteite Zn[As2O4] and paulmooreite Pb[As2O5]. More complex arsenites include schneiderhöhnite Fe2+Fe3+3[As5O13] and ludlockite PbFe3+4As10O22.

Nickel–Strunz classification -04- oxides 
IMA-CNMNC proposes a new hierarchical scheme (Mills et al., 2009). This list uses it to modify the Classification of Nickel–Strunz (mindat.org, 10 ed, pending publication).

Abbreviations:
"*" - IMA/CNMNC status: discredited.
"?" - IMA/CNMNC status: questionable/doubtful.
"REE" - Rare-earth element (Sc, Y, La, Ce, Pr, Nd, Pm, Sm, Eu, Gd, Tb, Dy, Ho, Er, Tm, Yb, Lu)
"PGE" - Platinum-group element (Ru, Rh, Pd, Os, Ir, Pt)
03.C Aluminofluorides, 06 Borates, 08 Vanadates (04.H V[5,6] Vanadates), 09 Silicates:
Neso: insular (from Greek νησος nēsos, island)
Soro: grouping (from Greek σωροῦ sōros, heap, mound (especially of corn))
Cyclo: ring
Ino: chain (from Greek ις [genitive: ινος inos], fibre)  
Phyllo: sheet (from Greek φύλλον phyllon, leaf) 
Tekto: three-dimensional framework
Nickel–Strunz code scheme: NN.XY.##x
NN: Nickel–Strunz mineral class number
X: Nickel–Strunz mineral division letter
Y: Nickel–Strunz mineral family letter
##x: Nickel–Strunz mineral/group number, x add-on letter

Class: arsenites 
 04.H V[5,6] Vanadates
 04.HB Uranyl Sorovanadates: 05 Carnotite, 05 Margaritasite; 10 Sengierite; 15 Fritzscheite, 15 Curienite, 15 Francevillite; 20 Metavanuralite, 20 Vanuralite; 25 Metatyuyamunite, 25 Tyuyamunite; 30 Strelkinite, 35 Uvanite, 40 Rauvite 
 04.HC [6]-Sorovanadates: 05 Magnesiopascoite, 05 Lasalite, 05 Pascoite; 10 Hummerite, 15 Sherwoodite
 04.HD Inovanadates: 05 Rossite, 10 Metarossite, 15 Munirite, 20 Metamunirite, 25 Dickthomssenite, 30 Ansermetite
 04.HE Phyllovanadates: 05 Melanovanadite, 10 Shcherbinaite; 15 Hewettite, 15 Metahewettite; 20 Bokite, 20 Bariandite, 20 Corvusite, 20 Fernandinite, 20 Straczekite; 25 Haggite, 30 Doloresite, 35 Duttonite, 40 Cavoite
 04.HF Tektovanadates: 05 Bannermanite
 04.HG Unclassified V oxides: 05 Fervanite, 10 Huemulite, 15 Vanalite, 20 Simplotite, 25 Vanoxite, 30 Navajoite, 35 Delrioite, 40 Metadelrioite, 45 Barnesite, 50 Hendersonite, 55 Grantsite, 60 Lenoblite, 65 Satpaevite
04.J Arsenites, Antimonites, Bismuthites, Sulfites
04.JA Arsenites, antimonites, bismuthites; without additional anions, without H2O: 05 Leiteite, 10 Reinerite, 15 Karibibite; 20 Schafarzikite, 20 Trippkeite, 20 Kusachiite; 25 Apuanite, 30 Versiliaite, 35 Schneiderhohnite, 40 Zimbabweite; 45 Ludlockite, 45 Ludlockite-(Pb)*; 50 Paulmooreite, 55 Stibivanite, 60 Chadwickite  
04.JB Arsenites, antimonites, bismuthites; with additional anions, without H2O: 05 Fetiasite, 10 Manganarsite, 15 Magnussonite, 20 Armangite, 25 Nanlingite, 30 Asbecasite, 35 Stenhuggarite, 40 Trigonite, 45 Finnemanite, 50 Gebhardite; 55 Derbylite, 55 Graeserite, 55 Tomichite; 60 Hemloite, 65 Freedite, 70 Georgiadesite, 75 Ekatite
04.JC Arsenites, antimonites, bismuthites; without additional anions, with H2O: 05 Cafarsite, 10 Lazarenkoite, 15 Rouseite, 20 Vajdakite
04.JD Arsenites, antimonites, bismuthites; with additional anions, with H2O: 05 Nealite, 05 Nealite-(H2O)*; 10 Seelite-1, 10 Seelite-2; 15 Tooeleite
04.JE Sulfites: 05 Gravegliaite, 10 Hannebachite, 15 Orschallite, 20 Scotlandite
04.JF Selenites without additional anions, without H2O: 05 Molybdomenite
04.JG Selenites with additional anions, without H2O: Prewittite; 05 Parageorgbokiite, 05 Georgbokiite; 10 Chloromenite, 15 Sofiite, 20 Ilinskite, 25 Francisite, 30 Derriksite, 35 Burnsite, 40 Allochalcoselite
04.JH Selenites without additional anions, with H2O: 05 Chalcomenite; 10 Ahlfeldite, 10 Clinochalcomenite, 10 Cobaltomenite; 15 Mandarinoite, 20 Orlandiite, 25 Larisaite
04.JJ Selenites with additional anions, with H2O: 05 Marthozite, 10 Guilleminite, 15 Piretite, 20 Demesmaekerite, 25 Haynesite
04.JK Tellurites without additional anions, without H2O: 05 Walfordite, 05 Winstanleyite, 10 Spiroffite, 10 Zincospiroffite, 15 Balyakinite, 20 Rajite, 25 Carlfriesite, 30 Denningite, 35 Chekhovichite, 40 Smirnite, 45 Choloalite, 50 Fairbankite, 55 Plumbotellurite, 60 Magnolite, 65 Moctezumite, 70 Schmitterite, 75 Cliffordite
04.JL Tellurites with additional anions, without H2O: 05 Rodalquilarite, 10 Mackayite, 15 Mroseite, 20 Pingguite, 25 Tlapallite, 30 Girdite
04.JM Tellurites without additional anions, with H2O: 05 Keystoneite, 05 Kinichilite, 05 Zemannite, 10 Emmonsite, 15 Graemite, 20 Teineite
04.JN Tellurites with additional anions, with H2O: 05 Sonoraite, 10 Poughite; 15 Cesbronite, 15 Cesbronite-x; 20 Eztlite, 25 Oboyerite, 30 Juabite
 04.K Iodates
 04.KA Iodates without additional anions, without H2O: 05 Lautarite
 04.KB Iodates with additional anions, without H2O: 05 Salesite, 10 Schwartzembergite, 15 Seeligerite
 04.KC Iodates without additional anions, with H2O: 05 Bellingerite, 10 Bruggenite
 04.KD Iodates with additional anions, with H2O: 05 Dietzeite, 10 George-ericksenite
04.X Unclassified Strunz Oxides (Arsenites, antimonites, bismuthites, sulfites, selenites, tellurites, iodates) 
04.XX Unknown: 00 Methane hydrate-I, 00 Methane hydrate-II, 00 Methane hydrate-H

References